Walapane Divisional Secretariat is a  Divisional Secretariat  of Nuwara Eliya District, of Central Province, Sri Lanka.

Grama Niladhari Divisions of Walapane

References

 Divisional Secretariats Portal

Divisional Secretariats of Nuwara Eliya District
Geography of Nuwara Eliya District